Free (Based Freestyles Mixtape) is a collaborative mixtape by American rappers Lil B and Chance the Rapper. It was released for free on August 5, 2015.

Critical reception

Track listing

Track notes 
 "Last Dance" contains uncredited vocals from Noname.

References

2015 mixtape albums